The 2011 Giro di Lombardia was the 105th edition of the Giro di Lombardia single-day cycling race, often known as the Race of the Falling Leaves. It was the 26th and final event of the 2011 UCI World Tour.

 rider Oliver Zaugg won the race, having attacked on the final climb of Salita di Ello and stayed away until the end, winning a race for the first time in his professional career. The two-time defending race winner and World Tour points leader Philippe Gilbert finished in eighth position, 16 seconds down on Zaugg.

Teams
As the race was held under the auspices of the UCI World Tour, all eighteen ProTour teams were invited automatically.

Results

References

Giro Di Lombardia, 2011
Giro di Lombardia
Giro di Lombardia